Scott Steele (born 24 July 1993 in Dumfries, Scotland) is a Scotland international rugby union player. His primary position is as a scrum-half. He currently plays for Harlequins.

Rugby Union career

Amateur career

Steele began his rugby union career with Dumfries Saints.

Professional career

In 2011, Steele was playing with the Scotland Under 18s when his team-mate Corey Venus told him that Leicester Tigers needed a scrum half. Steele enquired and landed a trial, then an academy contract, and then a two-year deal with the Tigers.

He was signed by London Irish in 2014. On 1 March 2016 it was announced that Steele had signed a two-year contract extension which would see him remain at London Irish until the end of the 2017-18 season. He was released ahead of the 2020–21 season.

He joined Harlequins in July 2020.

International career

Steele has represented Scotland at under-17,under-18 and under-20 level. He was named in the senior Scotland squad for the 2020 Six Nations match against Wales. He came off the bench to play on the Wing in a 14-10 win for Scotland.

Football career

He has also played pro youth football for Kilmarnock.

References

External links 

 London Irish profile

1993 births
Living people
People educated at Merchiston Castle School
Leicester Tigers players
Scotland international rugby union players
Dumfries Saints players
Harlequin F.C. players
London Irish players
Rugby union players from Dumfries
Scottish rugby union players
Rugby union flankers